Colloton is a surname. Notable people with the surname include:

Ann Colloton, American swimmer
John W. Colloton (born 1931), American hospital executive 
Pat Colloton (born 1944), American politician
Steven Colloton (born 1963), American judge, son of John